Krimpen may refer to:

Places 
 Krimpen aan de Lek, a town in Krimpenerwaard, South Holland, Netherlands
 Krimpen aan den IJssel, a town and municipality in South Holland, Netherlands

People 
 Jan van Krimpen (1892–1958), Dutch typographer and type designer
 Wim van Krimpen (born 1941), Dutch art dealer

Games 
 Krimpen (card game), an historical Austro-German card game